Floridian may refer to:

 Floridian, the demonym for a person from Florida
 Floridian (train), a train operated by Amtrak from 1971 to 1979
 Miami Floridians, a professional basketball franchise in the original, now-defunct American Basketball Association
 , a United States Navy troop transport in commission in 1919

See also
 The Floridian (disambiguation)
 Floridiana, a term referring to artifacts relating to the state of Florida